Asthenotricha semidivisa is a moth in the family Geometridae first described by William Warren in 1901. It is found in Cameroon, the Democratic Republic of the Congo, Kenya, Madagascar and Uganda.

Subspecies
Asthenotricha semidivisa semidivisa (Cameroon, Uganda, Madagascar)
Asthenotricha semidivisa euchroma Prout, 1921 (Democratic Republic of the Congo)

References

Moths described in 1901
Asthenotricha
Moths of Africa
Moths of Madagascar